Extrema  is an Italian thrash metal/groove metal band from Milan. They sing in English.

History 
Extrema formed in 1986 in Milan. The initial lineup included guitarist Tommy Massara, vocalist/guitarist Andrea Boria, bassist Luca Varisco, and drummer Stefano Bullegas. Regarded as one of Italy's first thrash metal bands, Extrema's first EP, We Fuckin' Care (1987), sold 3,000 copies largely by word of mouth. Italian heavy metal fans did not yet seem prepared to embrace local talent, however, and the next four years saw Extrema (by then entirely re-vamped, with Massara signing on new members Gianluca Perotti on vocals, Mattia Bigi on bass, and Chris Dalla Pellegrina on drums) relegated to open for visiting acts like Slayer, D.R.I., and Corrosion of Conformity. Finally realizing that their only hope of impressing local talent scouts lay in marketing themselves abroad, Extrema started aggressively shopping their demos to international heavy metal critics, and even financed a trip to New York City for a one-off gig. The strategy worked, and their four-track demo from 1991 was soon attracting the attention of some major international publications, eventually leading to a record deal with Contempo Records. The result was the 1993's Tension at the Seams album, which led to stadium support slots with Italian rock star Vasco Rossi, and more importantly a high-profile metal festival appearance in Turin alongside Megadeth, The Cult, Suicidal Tendencies, and Metallica. The album also featured an unconventional cover of The Police's Truth Hits Everybody and spawned a video clip for the track Child O' Boogaow which was on heavy rotation on Italy's MTV affiliate, Videomusic.

Capping off their most successful year, Extrema issued a six-track live EP entitled Proud, Powerful 'n' Alive, and then got right back on the road, playing upwards of 50 shows across Italy before signing with new label Flying Records and getting to work on their next album. Released in 1995, The Positive Pressure (Of Injustice) boasted improved production values while updating their thrash metal style to keep pace with the era's groove metal acts such as Pantera and Machine Head.

Despite a waning interest in Extrema in the late 1990s, Massara kept the band going, and Extrema released a string of albums in the following years, with 2001's Better Mad Than Dead and V2's Set the World on Fire (2005). In 2009 Extrema switched to Scarlet Records, where they recorded Pound for Pound and The Seed of Foolishness (2013).

Band members

Current members 
 Tommy Massara – guitars 
 Tiziano "Titian" Spigno – vocals 
 Gabri Giovanna – bass 
 Francesco "Frullo" La Rosa – drums

Former members 
 Andrea Boria – vocals, guitars 
 Gianluca Perotti – vocals 
 Luca Varisco – bass, backing vocals 
 Stefano Bullegas – drums 
 Daniele Vecchi – vocals 
 Walter Andreatta – guitars 
 Chris Dalla Pellegrina – drums 
 Mattia Bigi – bass 
 Julias Loglio – guitars 
 Paolo Crimi – drums

Discography

Studio albums 
 Tension at the Seams – 1993
 The Positive Pressure (Of Injustice) – 1995
 Better Mad Than Dead – 2001
 Set the World on Fire – 2005
 Pound for Pound – 2009
 The Seed of Foolishness – 2013
 Headbanging Forever – 2019

EP's 
 We Fuckin' Care – 1987
 Proud, Powerful 'n' Alive – 1993

Live 
 "Raisin' Hell with Friends – Live at the Rolling Stone" – 2007

Best of 
 And the Best Has Yet to Come – 2003

References

External links 
  Sito ufficiale
  MySpace
  YouTube
  Facebook

Italian thrash metal musical groups
Musical groups established in 1986
Musical quartets
1986 establishments in Italy
Musical groups from Milan
Scarlet Records artists